Rich Hall's Fishing Show is a comedy programme written by and starring Rich Hall and Mike Wilmot. It was first broadcast on 11 November 2003 in the United Kingdom on BBC Four. It was repeated in the UK on Dave in 2008. The Fishing with the Corleones sequence involving the late Anita Roddick was omitted from the repeat.

The show was set in the lochs of Scotland, on which Hall and Wilmot would go fishing. However, very few fish were caught, and the situation instead formed the setting for dialogue between the pair which would be vaguely themed on subjects like love or the Olympic Games. Some episodes featured sketches involving characters such as Bob, a decapitated limousine driver whose head had survived, and Charles Manson, a reclusive salesman who, despite his appearance, was not the convicted serial killer of the same name. Each episode would end with a celebrity guest who was invited on to the boat to talk and fish with the pair.

At the end of each show, a celebrity guest would appear and talk with Hall and Wilmot. The idea was seen earlier in a pilot the pair had called Rich Hall's Badly Funded Think Tank. In that show, the segment was titled "Fishing with the Corleones", but in the Fishing Show these sections are unappended.

Episode list
The show was directed by Chris Cottam, with the writing of the episodes done by Hall.

See also
Rich Hall
Mike Wilmot

References

External links

2003 British television series debuts
2003 British television series endings
BBC television comedy
Fishing television series